The Brass Legend is a 1956 American Western film directed by Gerd Oswald and written by Don Martin. The film stars Hugh O'Brian, Nancy Gates, Raymond Burr, Rebecca Welles, Donald MacDonald and Robert Burton. The film was released on December 12, 1956, by United Artists.

Plot
Wanted outlaw Tris Hatten turns up in Apache Bend, looking for former sweetheart Millie Street, a saloon girl. Clay Gipson, the little brother of Sheriff Wade Addams' girlfriend, spots the fugitive and informs the sheriff, who knocks Hatten cold and takes him to jail.

Town opinion turns against the popular Wade, who is suspected by girlfriend Linda's father, rancher Tom Gipson, of being after a reward for Hatten that rightfully should go to the boy, Clay. In truth, Wade is trying to protect the child, particularly when the notorious Barlow gang rides into town to try to spring Hatten.

A reporter named Tatum helps damage the sheriff's reputation by revealing Clay to be the informant. Clay is wounded by a gunshot, bringing dad Tom to his senses. After shooting two of the Barlows, proving his courage, Wade must apprehend Hatten, who has had a gun smuggled to him in jail. Hatten shoots the reporter, but can't outdraw Wade.

Cast 
Hugh O'Brian as Sheriff Wade Addams
Nancy Gates as Linda Gipson
Raymond Burr as Tris Hatten
Rebecca Welles as Millie Street (billed as Reba Tassell)
Donald MacDonald as Clay Gipson
Robert Burton as Tom Gipson
Eddie Firestone as Shorty
Willard Sage as Jonathan Tatum
Robert Griffin as Doc Ward
Stacy Harris as George Barlow
Dennis Cross as Carl Barlow
Russell Simpson as Deputy 'Pop' Jackson
Norman Leavitt as Deputy Cooper
Vicente Padula as Sanchez 
Clegg Hoyt as Bartender
Jack Farmer as Earl Barlow
Michael Garrett as Deputy Charlie
Charles Delaney as Deputy
Paul Sorensen as Burly Apache Bend Townsman
Sam Flint as Old Apache Bend Townsman
Rick Warick as Deputy

References

External links 
 

1956 films
1950s English-language films
United Artists films
American Western (genre) films
1956 Western (genre) films
Films scored by Paul Dunlap
1950s American films
American black-and-white films